Erika Lust (born 1977) is a Swedish erotic film director, screenwriter and producer. Since the debut of her first indie erotic film The Good Girl in 2004, Lust has been cited as one of the current leading participants in the feminist pornography movement, asserting that an ethical production process sets her company apart from mainstream pornography sites. Lust has stated that she finds no issue in calling her films porn, since she expects viewers to be sexually aroused, unlike other directors of erotic films who make a distinction between their work and porn even when both types contain sexually explicit scenes. In addition to directing and producing a number of award-winning films, she has written several books.

Background 
Lust was born Erika Hallqvist in Stockholm, Sweden, in 1977. She harboured a passion for film and theatre.

She went to Lund University, where she studied Political Sciences. While there, she came across Linda Williams' 1989 book Hard Core: Power, Pleasure, and the "Frenzy of the Visible", which would influence her filmmaking later. She graduated with a BA in 1999, with a specialization in human rights and feminism. After graduation she moved to Barcelona in 2000 and started studying filmmaking.

Career 
Lust shot her first film, the explicit short The Good Girl in 2004, which became an instant hit. Released online for free under a Creative Commons license, it was downloaded millions of times in several days and two million times in two months. The film was shown at the Barcelona International Erotic Film Festival the next year and won a Ninfa Award.

In 2005, after this initial success, she founded her video production company Lust Films. The company has produced erotic short films and compilations steadily from then on. Five Hot Stories For Her, an anthology of five vignettes including The Good Girl, won the Barcelona International Erotic Film Festival's 2007 Best Spanish Screenplay award, the Venus Berlin Fair's 2007 Eroticline Award for Best Adult Film for Women, and the 2008 Feminist Porn Award for Movie of the Year. Since then she has been a regular on the adult cinema festival circuit, and in 2020 one of her films came to the cinema in the regular process for the first time.

Development 
Lust's films are characterized by carefully cast actors and high standards of production in adult film. Lust believes explicit film can be an educational tool besides being pleasurable and can help us better understand our sexuality, to live more freely and naturally. She hopes to influence viewers' conceptions of gender roles in sexuality. She considers pornography to be the "most important discourse on gender and sexuality".

In 2010, Lust opened an online erotic cinema called Lust Cinema, exhibiting her own films and those of other authors of the new wave of explicit films. She started the first crowdsourced project in the history of adult cinema in 2013, calling it XConfessions. It has become her main source of work in the years thereafter.

In 2017 Glamour Magazine listed Lust Cinema as one of the 15 Feminist Porn Sites That You’ll Really, Really Enjoy. In 2019 Erika was named as one of the BBC's 100 Most Influential Women of the Year.

Other projects 
Lust has written several books on eroticism and sexuality; her first book Good Porn was published in 2009 by Seal Press. In it, she lists such common myths associated with ‘phony, predictable porn for men’, including: #2. Men can always get it up; #6. When a man is choking a woman with his dick, she always smiles and enjoys it; #7. Beautiful young women just love to have sex with fat, ugly, middle-aged men; #13. Every lesbian is tall, thin and pretty and has long hair and nails.

Lust runs an online store offering her books and films, as well as sex toys and other erotic wares. In February 2016, her company had about 15 employees.

In 2017, in consultation with sex educators Lust created a porn-education website for parents, "The Porn Conversation". The site provides links to research and tips for talking to kids about the unrealistic nature of mainstream porn.

Films 
Her film Cabaret Desire (2011) won her the Feminist Porn Award for Movie of the Year in 2012 and the CineKink Audience Choice Award for Best Narrative Feature. It was cited as an example of the diversity of porn at the 2013 Berlin Porn Film Festival providing a space for rethinking sex, sexuality, and pornography.

In 2020, her film The Intern received three film nominations for the XBIZ Europa Awards including Feature Movie of the Year, Best Acting (won) and Best Sex Scene in a Feature Movie. Her film Super Femmes was also nominated for Best Lesbian Sex Scene (won) and was the first time in the history of XBIZ Europa Awards where a Big Beautiful Woman (BBW) or trans performer were nominated in a non-genre specific category. Erika Lust Films was also nominated for Global Studio Brand of the Year, and her online streaming platform XConfessions was nominated for Erotic Site of the Year.

XConfessions 
In 2014 Lust and other directors began producing short pornographic films based on crowd-sourced stories. Viewers can leave anonymous confessions on the project's website. Each month, Lust handpicks two stories and turn them into cinematic short films. XConfessions has been presented at the Berlin Porn Festival 2014. The first two compilations of her XConfessions series have won her the Feminist Porn Awards for Hottest Straight Vignette in 2014 and 2015 respectively.

In 2015, a theatrical cut of XConfessions was screened at Chicago International Film Festival and at Raindance Film Festival in London. 
 
Lust held two sold-out screenings of the XConfessions Theatrical Cut at Kino Babylon in Berlin in February 2016, and went on to win the Best Narrative Short CineKink Award for short film An Appointment with My Master.

Criticism 
Erika Lust was one of the female filmmakers featured in "Women on Top", the first episode of the Netflix documentary series Hot Girls Wanted: Turned On, focusing on the filming of "Hysterical Piano Concert" (XConfessions 2016). Gail Dines writes that rather than being a film of empowerment in which a female pianist fulfills a fantasy, the woman with no prior film experience is subjected to stereotypical porn sex that leaves her traumatized and in pain, but is persuaded by Lust to continue. Kat Banyard states that "feminist porn" as promoted by Lust is another brand that does not challenge the mainstream, but serves as another entry point for potential customers. While not in favor of any type of censorship, which she views as having greater effect on the powerless, philosopher Amia Srinivasan says that sex on film impedes the development of sexual imagination, which has a greater impact on the young.

In a study of feminist pornography, Carmen Pena Ardid, Professor of Literature and Film at the University of Zaragoza, cites Lust as opening a way for women as inventors of fantasies and producers of pornographic sexual representations, but her work does not resolve the models of femininity imposed by fashion, advertising or the cosmetics industry, and the constrained social situations within which fantasies are lived. Álvaro Martín Sanz, professor of film studies at the University of Valladolid, while recognizing Lust as pioneering the rejection of the heteronormativity present in traditional pornographic cinema, also finds limitations in the pursuit of beauty and the focus on fantasies rather than more realistic portrayals.

Erika Lust argues that no sexual acts, including temporary and consensual self-objectification, BDSM, risk-aware violence, or extreme fantasy, should be labeled "non-feminist". Richard Kimberly Heck, Philosophy Professor at Brown University, defends Lust from criticisms by Hans Maes. Maes finds The Good Girl little different than mainstream porn due to the generally passive behavior of the female character Alex, and the performance of a "facial" in the final scene. Heck finds the behavior of Alex more realistic than the stereotypical nymphomaniac of porn movies, and notes that Lust's view is that any sexual activity, including those assumed to be degrading, may by enjoyed by some, and are feminist if done by consent.

Books 

 2009: X: a Woman's Guide to Good Porn (alternate title: Good Porn: A Woman's Guide)
 First published 2008 in Spanish as Porno para mujeres (Porn for Women)
 2010: Erotic Bible to Europe
 2010: Love Me Like You Hate Me with Venus O'Hara
 2011: Shooting Sex: How to Make an Outstanding Sex Movie with Your Partner (ebook also available in Polish)
 2011: Six Female Voices with Antia Pagant
 2013: La Canción de Nora (Nora's Song)
 2013: Let's Make a Porno

Honours and awards

References

External links 
 
 

Feminist pornography
Sex-positive feminists
Swedish pornographic film directors
Swedish pornographic film producers
Women pornographic film directors
1977 births
Living people
Lund University alumni
BBC 100 Women
Businesspeople from Stockholm
Individualist feminists